His Highness Maharaja Bahadur Sri Sir Ishwari Prasad Narayan Singh, GCSI (1822 – 13 June 1889) was the Maharaja of Benares.  He ascended the throne at the age of 13. During the Indian Rebellion of 1857, he remained neutral for the sake of his people, as he has not forgotten the treachery of his countrymen in the battle against Hastings. As a reward, he was promoted to the rank of Maharaja Bahadur in 1859. In 1867, he was granted a personal 13-gun salute; a decade later he was knighted with the GCSI, becoming Sir Ishwari. He eventually became a member of the Viceroy's Legislative Council, and in the crowning achievement of his reign, he restored all the family lands that had been lost for over a century.

He was a great poet-scholar and established Sanskrit College in Varanasi (now known as Sapoornaand Sanskrit University). He was the mentor of Babu 'Bhartendu' Harischandra, the father of modern Hindi. He was a saint-King, and his name is mentioned in Naveen-Bhaktamaal along with the eminent saints of the nineteenth century. He was a disciple of Dev Swami and Shyamacharan Lahiri Mahashy. He was very popular among his people, who kept small earthen busts of him in their homes. He was a great patron of Art, Music and Literature. He was also the chief patron of Gulabi Minakari work and company school miniature painting style (Benares school), which saw a steep decline after his death. He started the first Hindi Theater and the Benares School of Art, thus he is called 'The Second Jahangir'. He was given the title of His Highness in 1889. HH Maharaja Sir Ishwari Prasad Narayan Singh died several months later at the age of 67, and was succeeded by his adopted son, Prabhu Narayan Singh Sahib Bahadur.

References

Narayan dynasty
Maharajas of Benares
1822 births
1889 deaths